Clayhole is an unincorporated community in Breathitt County, Kentucky. Clayhole has a post office with ZIP code 41317.

The most prominent church is Clayhole Brethren Church. There is another church located on Riley Branch Road in Clayhole as well, which has a small cemetery located on its grounds in which less than ten (10) people are currently buried. There are two much larger cemeteries located in Clayhole, Kentucky: the T-Point Cemetery (The Haddix Family Cemetery is also located beside the church building on the T-Point);   and the McIntosh Cemetery.  These cemeteries are located within approximately two and one/half to three miles of each other on the main paved road running through Clayhole.

References

Unincorporated communities in Breathitt County, Kentucky
Unincorporated communities in Kentucky